"Tættere på himlen" is a Danish language hit song by Burhan G, a Danish pop singer, songwriter and producer of Kurdish/Turkish origin, featuring Danish duo Nik & Jay. "Tættere på himlen" (translated as Closer to heaven) appeared on the 2010 album Burhan G and was released on the Danish record label Copenhagen Records. It is the second #1 hit for Burhan G on Tracklisten, the official Danish Singles Chart.

Chart performance

First release
The single was originally released in April 2010 and it entered the Tracklisten, the Danish singles chart at #9 on the chart dated 24 April 2010. In its second week, it went down to #27 (chart dated 30 April 2010), thus ending its first run in the charts.

Rerelease
The single was rereleased in October 2010 entering at #27 on the Danish Singles Chart dated 1 October 2010 and jumping to #1 on chart of 8 October 2010 in its second week of rerelease.

References

2010 singles
Number-one singles in Denmark
Burhan G songs
Danish-language songs
2010 songs
Copenhagen Records singles
Song articles with missing songwriters